Paul Tana (born January 8, 1947) is an Italian-Canadian film director and screenwriter. He is most noted for his 1992 film La Sarrasine, which received ten Genie Award nominations at the 13th Genie Awards in 1992 including a nomination for Tana in the Best Original Screenplay category.

Born in Ancona, Marche, Italy, Tana emigrated to Canada with his family in childhood. He studied literature at the Université du Québec à Montréal before joining the Association Coopérative des Productions Audio-Visuelles, for whom he made a number of short films before releasing his debut feature film, Day by Day (Les grands enfants), in 1980.

His 1985 documentary film Caffè Italia, Montréal won the Prix L.-E.-Ouimet-Molson from the Association québécoise des critiques de cinéma. He followed up with the narrative feature films La Sarrasine in 1992, and Mr. Aiello (La Déroute) in 1998.

Since Mr. Aiello, Tana has concentrated primarily on documentary films, most notably the Ricordato di noi project to recover lost footage of Montreal's Italian community newsmagazine television series Teledomenica. He has released two films in the Ricordato di noi series to date, Souviens-toi de nous in 2008 and Marguerita in 2015.

Filmography
Day by Day (Les grands enfants) - 1980
Caffè Italia, Montréal - 1985
Marchand de jouets - 1988
La Sarrasine - 1992
Mr. Aiello (La Déroute) - 1998
Parole d’artistes - 2003
Souviens-toi de nous - 2008
Marguerita - 2015
Le figuier - 2018
Fellini premières fois - 2020

References

External links

1947 births
Living people
20th-century Canadian screenwriters
20th-century Canadian male writers
21st-century Canadian screenwriters
21st-century Canadian male writers
Canadian male screenwriters
Canadian documentary film directors
Film directors from Montreal
Writers from Montreal
Italian emigrants to Canada
People from Ancona
Université du Québec à Montréal alumni